Callogaza is a genus of sea snails, marine gastropod mollusks in the family Margaritidae.

Description
The shells of the species in this genus are thin-walled and almost transparent. Because of this, they are iridescent. The outer lip is deflected. A flat callus of the inner lip covers completely or only in part the wide umbilicus (but only in fully grown species). These features form a synapomorphy with the genus Gaza.

The sculpture of Callogaza has stronger spiral and axial lines, in contrast with the almost uniform sculpture of Gaza. Calogaza possesses strong, elevated spiral cords in the upper part of each whorl. These are colored with brown spots.

Species
Species within the genus Callogaza include:
 Callogaza colmani Hickman, 2012
 Callogaza frederici (E. A. Smith, 1906)
 Callogaza sericata (Kira, 1959)
 Callogaza watsoni Dall, 1881
Species brought into synonymy
 Callogaza rotella Dall, 1881: synonym of Microgaza rotella rotella (Dall, 1881) 
 Callogaza superba Dall, 1881: synonym of Gaza superba (Dall, 1881)

References

External links
  Luiz Ricardo L. Simone & Carlo M. Cunha, Revision of genera Gaza and Callogaza (Vetigastropoda, Trochidae), with description of a new Brazilian species; Zootaxa1318: 1–40 (2006)

 
Margaritidae